Chuang Chi-fa (also known as Zhuang Jifa; ; born 24 May 1936) is a Taiwanese historian who studies Chinese history, in particular Manchu history. Chuang is one of the few linguistics researchers with a mastery of the Manchu language.

His 1982 book "Qing Gaozong shiquan wugong yanjiu" (researching the Qianlong Emperor's "Ten Great Campaigns") was called a tour de force by Yingcong Dai of William Paterson University. With Ch’en Chieh-hsien he was one of the first historians to research the Manchu language documents in the Qing dynasty archives at the National Palace Museum.

Early life
Chuang was born in Nanzhuang, Shinchiku Prefecture, Taiwan, Empire of Japan. His parents died when he was young, and he was adopted by a family and taught under strict doctrines that made him into the person he is today. He graduated from the National Taiwan Normal University and in 1969 from the National Taiwan University.

Career
Chuang teaches and studies modern Chinese history, Chinese minorities history, and Manchu history (his main focus). He was a researcher at the National Palace Museum.

Chuang has taught at Tamkang University, Soochow University, National Taiwan Normal University, and National Chengchi University.

References

Living people
20th-century Taiwanese historians
1936 births
Republic of China historians
Manchurologists
People from Miaoli County
National Taipei University of Education alumni
National Taiwan University alumni
Academic staff of Tamkang University
Academic staff of Soochow University (Taiwan)
Academic staff of the National Taiwan Normal University
Academic staff of the National Chengchi University
Hakka scientists
21st-century Taiwanese historians